Aegialia crescenta is a species of beetle in family Scarabaeidae. It is endemic to the United States.

References

Insects of the United States
Scarabaeidae
Taxonomy articles created by Polbot
Beetles described in 1977